Bentley Layton (born 12 August 1941), is  Professor of Religious Studies (Ancient Christianity) and Professor of Near Eastern Languages and Civilizations (Coptic) at Yale University (since 1983). He is a Harvard-educated scholar who has been central to the late 20th-century Rediscovery of Gnosticism, which was the title of the international conference he hosted at Yale in 1980 and the volume that came of it. His interests lie in the History of Christianity from its origins until the rise of Islam, Gnostic studies and Coptic.

With a summa cum laude thesis on the Nag Hammadi Gnostic Coptic Treatise on the Resurrection, which he presented in a critical edition in 1978, he has moved on to present critical editions of other texts: The Hypostasis of the Archons, Or, The Reality of the Rulers..., serialized in Harvard Theological Review 67 (1974) 351—425 and 69 (1976) 1—71, and others. His most accessible book is The Gnostic Scriptures: A New Translation with Annotations (Garden City: Doubleday & Co., 1987), which presents some of the enigmatic literature of gnostic Christianity for nonspecialists. He sets his selection of gnostic scripture, the writings of Valentinus and his followers, and related writings that display gnostic tendencies within the broader context of Early Christianity and Hellenistic Judaism, with generous introductions and plentiful annotations.

For specialists, Layton's Coptic grammar is a standard text. He catalogued all the Coptic manuscripts in the British Library. He is a board member on the  Harvard Theological Review and the Journal of Coptic Studies.

External links
Yale University: Bentley Layton curriculum vitae

1941 births
Living people
Harvard University alumni
American Christian theologians
Yale University faculty
Religion in Egypt
Historians of Gnosticism